2011–12 FIBA EuroChallenge was the eighth edition of Europe's third-tier level transnational men's professional club basketball FIBA EuroChallenge Tournament, organized by FIBA Europe.

Teams
The labels in the parentheses show how each team qualified for the place of its starting round. 
 1st, 2nd, 3rd, 4th, 5th, etc.: League position after eventual Playoffs
 EC: Transferred from Eurocup
 QR: Losers from qualifying rounds

Qualifying round

|-
|align=right| Spartak Primorye  || 141–147 || align=left|  Enisey || 75–58 || 66–89
|-
|align=right| Triumph Lyubertsy  || 168–151 || align=left|   Krasnye Krylya || 94–71|| 74–80
|-
|align=right|  Sokhumi  || 157–175 || align=left|   Minsk-2006 || 94–78 || 63–97
|-
|align=right| Atomerőmű SE  || 155–128 || align=left|  Arkadia Traiskirchen Lions || 70–48 || 80–85
|-
|align=right|  Tampereen Pyrintö  || 134–137 || align=left|   Szolnoki Olaj ||77–69 || 57–68
|-
|}

Regular season
The 32 teams are drawn into eight groups of four. In each group, teams play against each other home-and-away in a round-robin format. The group winners and runners-up advance to the last 16, while the third-placed teams and fourth-placed teams are eliminated.

If teams in the same group finished tied on points at the end of the regular season, tiebreakers were applied in the following order:
 Head-to-head record.
 Head-to-head point differential.
 Point differential during the regular season.
 Points scored during the regular season.
 Sum of quotients of points scored and points allowed in each regular season match.

Group A

Group B

Group C

Group D

Group E

Group F

Group G

Group H

Last 16
The sixteen teams were divided in four groups of four. In each group, teams play against each other home-and-away in a round-robin format. The group winners and runners-up advance to the quarterfinals, while the third-placed teams and fourth-placed teams are eliminated.

Group I

Group J

Group K

Group L

Quarter-finals
The eight teams that advanced from the last 16 be played in a best-of-three playoff format. Matches were played on 13, 15 and 20 March. Team 1 played the first and the third game (if necessary) at home.

|}

Final Four

The Final Four was held from 27 until 29 April 2012 in the Főnix Hall at Debrecen, Hungary.

Awards

Weekly MVP

Regular season

Last 16

Quarter-finals

See also
2011–12 Eurocup Basketball

References

External links
 Official website

2011
2011–12 in European basketball leagues